In gate-based quantum computing, various sets of quantum logic gates are commonly used to express quantum operations. The following tables lists several unitary quantum logic gates, together with their common name, how they are represented, and some of their properties. Controlled or Hermitian conjugate versions of some of these gates may not be listed.

Identity gate and global phase 

The identity gate is the identity operation , most of the times this gate is not indicated in circuit diagrams, but it is useful when describing mathematical results.

It has been described as being a "wait cycle", and a NOP.

The global phase gate introduces a global phase  to the whole qubit quantum state. A quantum state is uniquely defined up to a phase. Because of the Born rule, a phase factor has no effect on a measurement outcome:  for any .

Because  when the global phase gate is applied to a single qubit in a quantum register, the entire register's global phase is changed.

Also, 

These gates can be extended to any number of qubits or qudits.

Clifford qubit gates 
This table includes commonly used Clifford gates for qubits.

Note that if a Clifford gate A is not in the Pauli group,  or controlled-A are not in the Clifford gates. 

The Clifford set is not a universal quantum gate set.

Non-Clifford qubit gates

Relative phase gates 

This is equivalent to tracing a horizontal circle (a line of latitude), or a rotation along the z-axis on the Bloch sphere by  radians. A common example is the T gate where  (historically known as the  gate), the phase gate. Note that some Clifford gates are special cases of the phase shift gate: 

Extending  to a rotation about a generic phase of both basis states of a 2-level quantum system (a qubit) can be done with a series circuit: . When  this gate is the rotation operator  gate and if  it is a global phase.

The T gate's historic name of  gate comes from the identity , where .

Arbitrary single-qubit phase shift gates  are natively available for transmon quantum processors through timing of microwave control pulses. It can be explained in terms of change of frame.

As with any single qubit gate one can build a controlled version of the phase shift gate. With respect to the computational basis, the 2-qubit controlled phase shift gate is: shifts the phase with  only if it acts on the state :

 

The controlled-Z (or CZ) gate is the special case where . 

The controlled-S gate is the case when the controlled- when  and is a commonly used gate.

Rotation operator gates 

As Pauli matrices are related to the generator of rotations, these rotation operators can be written as matrix exponentials with Pauli matrices in the argument. Any  unitary matrix in SU(2) can be written as a product (i.e. series circuit) of three rotation gates or less.

The rotation matrices are related to the Pauli matrices in the following way : 

It's possible to work out the adjoint action of rotations on the Pauli vector, namely rotation effectively by double the angle  to apply Rodrigues' rotation formula:

 

Taking the dot product of any unit vector with the above formula generates the expression of any single qubit gate when sandwiched within adjoint rotation gates. For example, it can be shown that . Also, using the anticommuting relation we have .

Rotation operators have interesting identities. For example,  and  Also, using the anticommuting relations we have  and 

Global phase and phase shift can be transformed into each others with the Z-rotation operator: . 

The  gate represents a rotation of  about the x axis at the Bloch sphere .

Similar rotation operator gates exist for SU(3) using Gell-Mann matrices. They are the rotation operators used with qutrits.

Two qubit interaction gates 

The qubit-qubit Ising coupling or Heisenberg interaction gates Rxx, Ryy and Rzz are 2-qubit gates that are implemented natively in some trapped-ion quantum computers, using for example the Mølmer–Sørensen gate procedure.  

Note that these gates can be expressed in sinusoidal form also, for example  .

The CNOT gate can be further decomposed as products of rotation operator gates and exactly a single two qubit interaction gate, for example

 

The SWAP gate can be constructed from other gates, for example using the two qubit interaction gates: .

Non-Clifford swap gates 

The  gate performs half-way of a two-qubit swap (see Clifford gates). It is universal such that any many-qubit gate can be constructed from only  and single qubit gates. The  gate is not, however maximally entangling; more than one application of it is required to produce a Bell state from product states. The  gate arises naturally in systems that exploit exchange interaction.

For systems with Ising like interactions, it is sometimes more natural to introduce the imaginary swap or iSWAP.

SWAPα arises naturally in spintronic quantum computers.

The Fredkin gate (also CSWAP or CS gate), named after Edward Fredkin, is a 3-bit gate that performs a controlled swap. It is universal for classical computation. It has the useful property that the numbers of 0s and 1s are conserved throughout, which in the billiard ball model means the same number of balls are output as input.

Other named gates

Notes

References 

 Quantum computing
 Quantum gates